Meconopsis betonicifolia (syn. Meconopsis baileyi), the Himalayan blue poppy, is a species of flowering plant in the family Papaveraceae. It was first formally named for western science in 1912 by the British officer Lt. Col. Frederick Marshman Bailey.

Meconopsis betonicifolia is hardy in most of the United Kingdom and it has striking large blue flowers. This herbaceous perennial is often short-lived.

References

External links

betonicifolia
Flora of China
Flora of Arunachal Pradesh